Grand Prix motorcycle racing is the premier championship of motorcycle road racing, which has been divided into three classes since 1990: 125cc, 250cc and MotoGP. Former classes that have been discontinued include 350cc, 50cc/80cc and Sidecar. 250cc is the intermediate category; the 250cc refers to the size of the engines of the motorcycles that race in that class. The engines have twin cylinders, as opposed to the four cylinders used in MotoGP. The Grand Prix Road-Racing World Championship was established in 1949 by the sport's governing body, the Fédération Internationale de Motocyclisme (FIM), and is the oldest motorsport World Championship. The 250cc class was replaced in 2010 by a new class called Moto2. The 250cc engines were replaced by 600cc engines, which were supplied by Honda to all teams.

Each season consists of 12 to 18 Grands Prix contested on closed circuits, as opposed to public roads. Points earned in these events count toward the riders' and constructors' world championships. The rider's and constructor's championship are separate championships, but are based on the same point system. The number of points awarded at the end of each race to the top 15 qualifying riders depends on their placement. Points received by each finisher, from first 1st place to 15th place: 25, 20, 16, 13, 11, 10, 9, 8, 7, 6, 5, 4, 3, 2, 1. Historically, there have been several points systems. Results from all current Grands Prix count towards the championships; in the past, only a certain number of results were counted.

Phil Read and Max Biaggi have won the most championships, with four each. Dani Pedrosa is the youngest to win the championship; he was 19 years and 18 days old when he won the championship in 2004. Italian riders have won the most championships; 13 riders have won a total of 22 championships. Riders from Great Britain have won the second most; four riders have won a total of nine championships. Germans have won the third most, as four riders have won a total of seven championships. Bruno Ruffo won the inaugural championship in 1949. Hiroshi Aoyama was the last rider to win the 250cc championship in 2009. Toni Elías was the first champion of the Moto2 category. Augusto Fernández is the current champion; he won the 2022 Moto2 World Championship.

Champions

 The "Season" column refers to the season the competition was held, and wikilinks to the article about that season.
 The "Margin" column refers to the margin of points by which the winner defeated the runner-up.

By season

Multiple champions

By constructor

By nationality

References
Bibliography

 

Specific

250cc World Champions
Moto 250